Hampton Court is a 1991 Australian situation comedy series, produced by Gary Reilly Productions for the Seven Network.

The series was a spin-off of Hey Dad...! with the link being the inclusion here of actress Julie McGregor reprising her role of Betty Wilson. She continued to play that role in Hey Dad while this series was in production.

There are occasional cameo appearances by Hey Dad..! cast members.

Synopsis

Four young tenants share a flat in a building named Hampton Court. Betty, who has left her old flat, moves in next door.

The various tenants struggle with domestic chores, coming up with the rent, and hectic social lives. They team up to keep the baby secret from their meddling landlord, Mr. Colloudos (Roy Billing), a Greek immigrant. Colloudos lives upstairs with his off-screen wife and their pet rottweilers, and enforces a strict no-babies rule in the building.

The tenants are single mother Lisa and her baby; chronic job-hopper Richard who is often behind on his rent; naïve but sassy Sophie; and fun-loving pub musician Trevor.

Cast
 Danielle Spencer as Lisa Barrett
 Adam Willits as Richard Granville
 Maxine Klibingaitis as Sophie Verstak
 Rod Zuanic as Trevor 
 Roy Billing as Mr. Colloudos
 Julie McGregor as Betty Wilson

Production

With the original working title of Hampton House, this series was recorded when Hey Dad..! went into hiatus at the end of its fifth season.

Seven Network executives had suggested the inclusion of Hey Dad..! character Nudge, but due to Christopher Truswell wanting to move on to other projects, he was not involved.

Rachael Beck screen-tested for the role of Lisa. She impressed the creators so much, they decided to cast her as Samantha Kelly on Hampton Court'''s parent show, Hey Dad..!.

The Hampton Court set was the same one used in another Gary Reilly sitcom, My Two Wives, with a different colour of paint, among other minor changes.

Only a moderate ratings success in its Thursday night time-slot against rival powerhouses The Flying Doctors and E Street'', the program was not renewed beyond its initial series of thirteen half-hour episodes.

Episodes

See also
 List of Australian television series

External links
 
Hampton Court at the National Film and Sound Archive
TV Week blurb on Hampton Court

Australian television sitcoms
Seven Network original programming
Television shows set in New South Wales
1991 Australian television series debuts
1991 Australian television series endings
Australian television spin-offs